The French Rugby Union Championship of first division 1911-12 was won by Stade Toulousain  that beat Racing Club de France in the final.

Then was Stade Toulousain won for the first time the Bouclier de Brennus. Touloise won all the matches in the season.

In the semifinals, the Racing defeated SBUC (8-4) and the Stade Toulousain eliminated FC Lyon (13-5).

Context 
The 1912 Five Nations Championship was won by England and by Ireland, France was last.

Final

External links
 Compte rendu de la finale de 1912, sur lnr.fr

1912
Championship
France